The Quadrangle (or The Quad) is the student-run newspaper of Manhattan College.  
The Quadrangle publishes weekly on Tuesdays during the academic year at Manhattan College. It is editorially independent of the college's administration. The Quadrangle has continually published since its founding in 1924, when Manhattan College moved to its current location in the Riverdale section of The Bronx in New York City. The Quadrangle is an official club of Manhattan College and is open to students of all academic fields of study.

Prominent stories

2008 New York Times story
In 2008, The Quadrangle was mentioned in The New York Times after writing a story about a proposed chastity club on the Manhattan College campus. The idea was proposed by then college president Brother Thomas J. Scanlan, and never came to fruition.

Notable interviews
 Andrew Cuomo
 Rubén Díaz Jr.
 Rudy Giuliani
 Steve Masiello
 Gary Sanchez
 JoJo
 Mike Posner
 Shaggy
 T-Pain

Operations

Editorial board
The Quadrangles editorial board operates on one-year-long terms, which begin in January in conclude in December. The editor-in-chief is chosen by the outgoing board in an election in November. The editor-in-chief then selects club members to fill out the rest of the board. Each of the four sections of the paper: news, features, arts and entertainment, and sports, has an editor and at least one assistant editor. The board also includes additional editors and assistant editors for social media, production and layout, and photography. In 2014, the Web Editor position was created. In 2017, the multimedia editor position was added. The editor-in-chief also appoints at least one managing editor.

In 2017, The Quadrangles editorial board, or masthead, is composed of nineteen Manhattan College students.

Traditions

The Triangle
Since 1982, The Quadrangle has published an annual satire edition, typically released near the April Fools' Day holiday.

Special editions
Since 2015, The Quadrangle has published special editions on a biennial basis. Topics discussed in recent special issues include gender, money, health and faith. Special editions are published once per semester.

People

Past editors-in-chief

References

External links
Official website

Student newspapers published in New York (state)
1924 establishments in New York (state)